The James Dennis House is an historic house located at 3120 Pawtucket Avenue in East Providence, Rhode Island.  This two-story wood-frame house was built sometime in the 1870s, and is a fine local example of Queen Anne Victorian style.  Its most prominent features are a square tower with pyramidal roof, and a decorated porch that wraps around three sides.  Although Pawtucket Avenue once had a significant number of such houses lining it, most have been demolished or significantly altered.

The house was listed on the National Register of Historic Places on November 28, 1980.

See also
National Register of Historic Places listings in Providence County, Rhode Island

References

Houses on the National Register of Historic Places in Rhode Island
Houses in Providence County, Rhode Island
Buildings and structures in East Providence, Rhode Island
National Register of Historic Places in Providence County, Rhode Island